Hard carbon is a solid form of carbon that cannot be converted to graphite by heat-treatment, even at temperatures as high as 3000 °C. It is also known as char, or non-graphitizing carbon. More colloquially it can be described as charcoal.

Hard carbon is produced by heating carbonaceous precursors to approximately 1000 °C in the absence of oxygen. Among the precursors for hard carbon are polyvinylidene chloride (PVDC), lignin and sucrose. Other precursors, such as polyvinyl chloride (PVC) and petroleum coke, produce soft carbon, or graphitizing carbon. Soft carbon can be readily converted to graphite by heating to 3000 °C.

The physical properties of the two classes of carbons are quite different. Hard carbon is a low density material, with extremely high microporosity, while soft carbon has little microporosity. Hard carbon is extensively used as anode materials in lithium-ion batteries and sodium-ion batteries.

Manufacturers of hard carbon include Xiamen Tob New Energy (China), Kuraray (Japan) and Stora Enso (Finland).

See also
Carbon
Graphitizing and non-graphitizing carbons
Carbonization
Graphite

References

External links
 Investigating hard carbons for battery materials
 Researchers use hard carbon for anode in sodium-ion batteries

Allotropes of carbon